Emir Biberoğlu (born 20 May 2001) is a professional footballer who plays as a midfielder for Turkish club İskenderunspor. Born in the Netherlands, he represents Turkey at international level.

Club career
A youth academy graduate of AZ, Biberoğlu made his professional debut for Jong AZ on 21 September 2020 in a 7–3 league win against De Graafschap.

On 9 July 2021, Dordrecht announced the signing of eight players including Biberoğlu after trials. His contract was terminated by mutual consent on 5 August 2022, as his prospects of playing time were severely diminished.

On 9 August 2022, Biberoğlu signed a two-year contract with İskenderunspor in the third-tier TFF Second League.

International career
Biberoğlu is a current Turkish youth national team player.

Career statistics

Club

References

External links
 

2001 births
Footballers from Amsterdam
Dutch people of Turkish descent
Living people
Dutch footballers
Turkish footballers
Turkey youth international footballers
Association football midfielders
Jong AZ players
FC Dordrecht players
İskenderun FK footballers
Eerste Divisie players
TFF Second League players